Amaranthine, amaranth, or amarantine may refer to:

Common uses
 Amaranthine (pigment), a betacyanin plant antioxidant and pigment
 Amaranth (color), a shade of reddish-rose
 Amaranth, a genus of plant

Music
 Amarantine (album), 2005 album by Enya
 "Amarantine" (song), single and title track of the above album
 "Amaranthine", a 1994 song by Faye Wong from the album Sky
 "Amaranthine", a 2011 song by the band Amaranthe from the self-titled album  Amaranthe
 "Amaranthine", a 2014 song by the band Crowbar from the album "Symmetry in Black"
 "Amaranthine", a 2015 song by the band Rhombus from the album Purity and Perversion
 "Amaranthine", a 2022 song by the band Cave In from the album Heavy Pendulum

Games
 Amaranthine, a fictional city featured as the main setting of Dragon Age: Origins – Awakening

See also
Amaranth (disambiguation)